Ilmar Aluvee (25 November 1969 – 17 January 2013) was an Estonian ski jumper, biathlete, and coach. He competed in the Nordic combined event at the 1994 Winter Olympics.

Early life
Ilmar Aluvee was born in Tallinn to former biathlete Valev Aluvee and Raaja Aluvee (née Kaasik). He graduated from secondary school in 1988 and was a 1997 graduate of Tallinn University of Technology. He began training with Uno Kajak in 1977 for Kalev Ski Club, and later with Tiit Tamm for Dünamo Ski Club.

Career
In 1994, Aluvee placed 39th in Lillehammer at the 1994 Winter Olympics. In 1993, he placed 34th at the FIS Nordic World Ski Championships, 31st in 1995, in 1997 he placed 10th in individual competition and 11th in team competition. Between 1988 and 1998 at the Estonian Championships, he won one gold, two silver, and five bronze medals in the biathlon and two bronze medals in ski jumping, and two gold, two silver and two bronze in summer biathlon and one silver in ski jumping.  

Between 1997 and 2001, Aluvee was a trainer at Tallinn's Estonian Sports Gymnasium and from 2006 until 2007, at the Otepää branch of the Audentes Gymnasium. Aluvee was the head coach of the national Estonian Biathlon Team from 2002 until 2004. In 2005, he began working as a cell tower installer.

Death 
On 17 January 2013, Aluvee was killed in an accidental fall while working on a cell tower in Aegviidu in Harju County, aged 43. He was interred at Rahumäe cemetery.

References

External links
 

1969 births
2013 deaths
Accidental deaths from falls
Accidental deaths in Estonia
Burials at Rahumäe Cemetery
Estonian male biathletes
Estonian male Nordic combined skiers
Industrial accident deaths
Nordic combined skiers at the 1994 Winter Olympics
Olympic Nordic combined skiers of Estonia
Sportspeople from Tallinn
Tallinn University of Technology alumni